Brahm Shanker Srivastava (born 1943) is an Indian microbiologist, inventor and a former deputy director and head of Microbiology division of the Central Drug Research Institute. He is the founder of Biotech Research, a non-profit non governmental institution promoting research in the field of biotechnology and is a director of Nextec Lifesciences Private Limited, a start up involved in biomedical products and research applications. He is known for his researches on microbial genetics and is an elected fellow of the National Academy of Sciences, India.

The Council of Scientific and Industrial Research, the apex agency of the Government of India for scientific research, awarded him the Shanti Swarup Bhatnagar Prize for Science and Technology, one of the highest Indian science awards for his contributions to Medical Sciences in 1984.

Biography 
B. S. Srivastava, born on 1 June 1943, earned his graduate degree from Banaras Hindu University and continued his studies at BHU to secure his masters' and doctoral degrees. Most of his academic career was spent at Jawaharlal Nehru University where he became a professor and the founder chair of the Centre for Biotechnology. Subsequently, he moved to the Central Drug Research Institute where he headed the Division of Microbiology and served as the deputy director of the institute. In 2012, along with Ranjana Srivastava, he founded Biotech Research, a not-for-profit research platform for promoting research in biotechnology. In between, he served at a number of universities which included Brown University, University of Maryland, Pasteur Institute of Lille, University of Ancona, Banaras Hindu University and Mizoram University as a visiting faculty.

Srivastava's researches covered the discipline of microbial genetics and he has done extensive studies of Vibrio cholerae. He is credited with the development of bacterial mutants which have applications in vaccine development and he holds a patent for his work. He has documented his researches by way of several articles in per-reviewed journals and his work has been cited by a number of authors and researchers. Besides, he has also contributed chapters to books published by others. He was associated with the Indo-US Vaccine Action Program as a member and traveled with the Indian delegation on Biotechnology which visited the US and China.

Awards and honors 
The Council of Scientific and Industrial Research awarded him Shanti Swarup Bhatnagar Prize, one of the highest Indian science awards in 1984. He received Om Prakash Bhasin Award in 1995 and the Government of Uttar Pradesh honored him with Vigyan Ratna Samman in 2002. He is an elected fellow of the National Academy of Sciences, India and the American Academy of Microbiology. The award orations delivered by him include Dr. Nitya Anand Endowment Lecture of the Indian National Science Academy in 1991 and Dr. Y.S. Narayana Rao Oration of the Indian Council of Medical Research in 1993.

Selected bibliography

See also 
 Mycobacterium tuberculosis

Notes

References

External links 
 

Recipients of the Shanti Swarup Bhatnagar Award in Medical Science
Indian medical writers
1943 births
Indian microbiologists
20th-century Indian inventors
Scientists from Lucknow
Banaras Hindu University alumni
Academic staff of Banaras Hindu University
Academic staff of Jawaharlal Nehru University
Brown University faculty
Pasteur Institute
Living people
Indian patent holders